Huang Haoxuan (born 15 January 1994) is a Chinese footballer who plays for China League Two side Guangxi Pingguo Haliao.

Club career
Huang Haoxuan started his professional football career in 2011 when he was promoted to Guangdong Youth's squad for the 2011 China League Two campaign. He joined China League One side Guangdong Sunray Cave in December 2013. On 15 March 2014, he made his debut for the club in a 2–2 home draw against Hebei Zhongji. He became an unattached player after Guangdong failed to register for the 2015 league season due to wage arrears.

Huang joined Guangzhou R&F's reserve team in July 2015. He was loaned to Hong Kong Premier League side R&F, which was the satellite team of Guangzhou R&F, in February 2017. He made his debut on 18 February 2017 in a 4–3 away win against Hong Kong FC.

Career statistics

References

External links

1994 births
Living people
Chinese footballers
Footballers from Guangxi
People from Beihai
Guangdong Sunray Cave players
Guangzhou City F.C. players
R&F (Hong Kong) players
Association football midfielders
China League One players
Hong Kong Premier League players
Guangxi Pingguo Haliao F.C. players